Bally Sports Great Lakes is an American regional sports network owned by Diamond Sports Group, and operates as an affiliate of Bally Sports. The channel, which is a sister network to Bally Sports Ohio, broadcasts statewide coverage of professional, collegiate and high school sports events throughout northern Ohio, including the Cleveland area.

Bally Sports Great Lakes is available from most cable providers in Northeast Ohio and select providers in other portions of Ohio (including Columbus), Northwest Pennsylvania, and extreme Western New York. It is also available nationwide on satellite via DirecTV, as well as outside Ohio on AT&T U-verse.

History
Bally Sports Great Lakes was launched on March 12, 2006, as SportsTime Ohio; it was founded by the family of Cleveland Indians owner Larry Dolan, becoming the second regional sports network in the Cleveland area, after Fox Sports Ohio (which launched in February 1989 as SportsChannel Ohio). SportsTime Ohio assumed the regional cable television rights to Major League Baseball games involving the Indians from Fox Sports Ohio, which had served as the exclusive local broadcaster of the Indians from 2002 to 2005, when it was majority-owned by Cablevision Systems Corporation (a New York-based company owned by Dolan's brother, Charles) until an asset trade with then-Fox Sports Net parent News Corporation who also owned 20th Century Fox and Fox News.  Jim Liberatore, former President of Fox Sports owned Speed Channel helped start the network and served as its first President.  His knowledge of the cable industry served a vital role in the success the network enjoyed while so many other team facilitated network launches failed across the country.

Starting off as rivals with Gannett-owned WKYC providing studio operations for the cable channel, the two networks would soon become corporate sisters, when on December 3, 2012, the Indians announced that it would sell SportsTime Ohio to Fox Sports Ohio parent Fox Entertainment Group. The deal was finalized four weeks later on December 28. Fox retained SportsTime Ohio's existing staff despite coming under common ownership with Fox Sports Ohio, with Katie Witham becoming a traveling reporter with the team. Now under new ownership, the network became a member of Fox Sports Networks.

In April 2013, at the beginning of the 2013 Major League Baseball season, SportsTime Ohio transitioned to the Fox Sports branding and imagery, but maintained the SportsTime Ohio branding (following the model of FSN's similar secondary channels Sun Sports, SportSouth, and Prime Ticket).

On December 14, 2017, as part of a merger between both companies, The Walt Disney Company announced plans to acquire all 22 regional Fox Sports networks from 21st Century Fox, including SportsTime Ohio, sister network Fox Sports Ohio, and Fox's 50% stake in the network's Cincinnati sub-feed. However, on June 27, 2018, the Justice Department ordered their divestment under antitrust grounds, citing Disney's ownership of ESPN. On May 3, 2019, Sinclair Broadcast Group and Entertainment Studios (through their joint venture, Diamond Holdings) bought Fox Sports Networks from The Walt Disney Company for $10.6 billion. The deal closed on August 22, 2019, thus putting SportsTime Ohio and Fox Sports Ohio under common ownership with several Sinclair stations in Ohio, which include WSYX/WTTE/WWHO in Columbus, WKRC-TV/WSTR-TV in Cincinnati, WNWO-TV in Toledo, WKEF/WRGT-TV in Dayton, and WTOV-TV in Steubenville, Ohio. The deal also marked Sinclair's entry into Northeast Ohio, where its nearest existing broadcasting properties are WSYX/WTTE/WWHO, WNWO-TV, WTOV-TV, and WPGH-TV/WPNT in Pittsburgh.

On November 17, 2020, Sinclair announced an agreement with casino operator Bally's Corporation to serve as a new naming rights partner for the FSN channels. Sinclair announced the new Bally Sports branding for the channels on January 27, 2021.  On March 31, 2021, coinciding with the start of the 2021 Major League Baseball season, SportsTime Ohio was rebranded as Bally Sports Great Lakes, with all other former Fox Sports Networks also rebranded as "Bally Sports" accompanied by a regional description appropriate for each network. The first live sporting event to air on Bally Sports Great Lakes under the Bally banner was the opening-day coverage of the Indians visiting the Tigers on April 1, which was preceded up by the Indians Live pregame show.

On March 14, 2023, Diamond Sports filed for Chapter 11 Bankruptcy.

Programming

Professional sports

Bally Sports Great Lakes holds the exclusive regional cable television rights to the Cleveland Guardians of Major League Baseball and is the cable outlet of the Cleveland Browns. The channel produces Guardians Live, a pre-game and post-game show bookending the channel's Guardians telecasts or any national games airing on another network. The network also is the primary TV outlet for Cleveland Monsters hockey, and secondary broadcaster of Columbus Crew soccer.

Original programming
Current
 Training Camp Daily - a daily 30 minute program which airs during Browns training camp
 Red Zone - A weekly Cleveland Browns oriented program
 The Guardians Report – A weekly show reviewing the previous week's Guardians games and headlines, and previewing upcoming team games and events.  
 Swing Clinic – a golf instructional show hosted by local PGA pro Jimmy Hanlin; is a part of the national Bally Sports Networks schedule
 18 Holes – a tour of various national golf courses hosted by Jimmy Hanlin and former LPGA golfer Natalie Gulbis; is a part of the national Bally Sports Networks schedule.

Current on-air staff

 Jock Callander
 Jim Donovan
 Tony Grossi
 Jensen Lewis
 Rick Manning
 Matt Underwood
 Al Pawlowski
 Andre Knott

References

External links

 
 List of SportsTime Ohio cable affiliates and channels (from STO partner WKYC)

Fox Sports Networks
Television channels and stations established in 2006
Companies that filed for Chapter 11 bankruptcy in 2023
Sports television networks in the United States
2006 establishments in Ohio
Television stations in Cleveland
Bally Sports